Gulnur Satylganova (born 1 November 1968) is a Kyrgyz singer.

Biography
Satylganova was born in Toktogul in western Kyrgyzstan. From 1987 to 1991, she studied at the conducting department of the Kyrgyz State Institute of Art named after Bübüsara Beyshenalieva (. Her professor was Nadezhda Kakhlova. At this university, she met such outstanding singers and poets as Kanıkey Eraliyeva and Ataybek Bodoshov.

After graduation, Satylganova worked for some time as an actress. At first she was employed in the "Kuudułdar" theatre, then she moved to the Asanbek Ömüraliev Theatre. Later she started acting onstage. She made her debut as a singer in 1986 and was soon accepted into the music group "Ming kyjał". Currently, she successfully continues her solo career. Although she is fluent in Russian, she usually performs songs in her native Kyrgyz. She is the winner of many state and international awards and she has been honored, among others, with the title of National Artist of the Kyrgyz Republic in 2008. She was the first Kyrgyz woman to be awarded the Order of St. George.

Personal life
Satylganova was married to Daniel Toktobayev with whom she has a son named Arnaz.

References

1968 births
Living people
Ethnic Kyrgyz people (individuals)
Kyrgyzstani women singers
People from Jalal-Abad Region